WRUF-FM (103.7 MHz) is a radio station broadcasting a country music format. Licensed to Gainesville, Florida, United States, the station serves the Gainesville/Ocala area.  The station is currently owned by the University of Florida. The station has been on the air since 1948.

Although the station is owned by a public university, the station, like AM sister WRUF, is operated as a commercial station in contrast to sister station WUFT-FM.

WRUF-FM has been a country station since October 2010.

History

Prior to 1981, WRUF played beautiful music and classical music under the moniker "Stereo 104," except for a Saturday-night disco music program from 1979-1980 called "Studio 104."

WRUF played a Top 40 style hit radio format from 1981 to 1983. The hit radio format was adopted because another local FM station, had recently switched to playing hits on the FM with great success.  The hit format had previously been played for many years on WRUF-AM, so technically, it was an easy switch, though many of the important powers at the University disfavored putting pop music on the FM.

WRUF became an album-oriented rock station identified as  "Rock 104" beginning in 1983.

On October 11, 2010, the University announced that WRUF-FM would switch to a country music format in the near future.  The "Rock 104" name and format will move to an internet-only station.

On October 15, 2010 WRUF-FM made the format change from rock to country, branded as "Country 103.7, The Gator".

Current Operations
Under the direction of Director of Programming Rob Harder, Operations Coordinator Brett T. Holcomb, and Sports Director Steve Russell,  "The Gator" also serves as the home for Florida Gators football, men's basketball, and Sunday baseball.

WRUF-FM programs the Bobby Bones morning show from 6-10 am followed by midday personality Jessie Roberts, Justin Tyler in afternoons, and The Big Time with Whitney Allen in the evenings.  WRUF-FM is the only "new country" formatted radio station in the Gainesville-Ocala radio market targeting adults 18–49 years of age.

Notable alumni
 Paul Castronovo, host of the syndicated morning radio program, ‘The Paul & Young Ron Show’, was a former Rock 104 disc jockey, as well as a graduate of the University of Florida.
 Conservative talk radio personality Andrew Wilkow, host of an eponymous show on Sirius Satellite Radio's "Sirius Patriot", is an alumnus of the station, having spent the latter half of his college years at the University of Florida. Unlike his current calling, his work at WRUF was solely as a disk jockey. 
 Rich Fields, the former announcer for CBS's The Price Is Right and Gameshow Marathon, was a former WRUF-FM afternoon drive disc-jockey and music director, as well as a graduate of the University of Florida. Rich Fields is also a recipient of the Red Barber Award for Broadcasting Excellence.
 Brad Abrell, co-host of the syndicated morning radio program, ‘The Ashley & Brad Show’, was a former Rock 104 disc jockey, as well as a graduate of the University of Florida.

References

External links
Station History from Central Florida Radio

RUF
Country radio stations in the United States
1948 establishments in Florida
Radio stations established in 1948